Ulla Werbrouck (born 24 January 1972 in Izegem) is a former Belgian politician and judoka.

At the 1996 Summer Olympics, she won the gold medal in the women's half-heavyweight category.

In January 2007, she joined the right-liberal List Dedecker party, newly established by her former trainer Jean-Marie Dedecker.
In the June 2007 federal elections, she was elected member of the Belgian Chamber of Representatives (2007–2009). At the 2009 Regional elections she was elected a member of the Flemish Parliament. In 2014, she was no longer up for reelection.

References

External links
 
 Judo Legends
 Profile at the website of the Flemish Parliament
 Personal website

1972 births
Living people
People from Izegem
Belgian female judoka
Judoka at the 1992 Summer Olympics
Judoka at the 1996 Summer Olympics
Judoka at the 2000 Summer Olympics
Olympic judoka of Belgium
Olympic gold medalists for Belgium
Libertair, Direct, Democratisch politicians
Members of the Belgian Federal Parliament
Members of the Flemish Parliament
Flemish politicians
Olympic medalists in judo
Sportspeople from West Flanders
Medalists at the 1996 Summer Olympics
21st-century Belgian politicians
21st-century Belgian women politicians
Belgian sportsperson-politicians